Opa or OPA may refer to:

Arts and media

Fictional characters and entities
 Olivia Pope & Associates, a fictional crisis management firm in Scandal (TV series)
 Outer Planets Alliance, a fictional organization in James S.A. Corey's Leviathan Wakes books and the TV series The Expanse  based upon them
 Opa-Opa, a character in the Fantasy Zone video game series

Film
 Opa!, a film starring Matthew Modine, Kosta Zorbas and Agni Scott

Music 
 Opa (Swedish band), a pop/folk band formed in 2012
 Opa (Uruguayan band), a 1969-1977 US-based jazz fusion group
 "Opa" (song), by Giorgos Alkaios, representing Greece at Eurovision 2010
 "Opa Opa", a 1992 song by Notis Sfakianakis; covered by Antique (1999) and Despina Vandi (2004)
 Opa Opa (album), or Mera Me Ti Mera, by Antique, 1999

Laws and international agreements 
 Obscene Publications Act 1959, an Act of Parliament in the United Kingdom
 Oil Pollution Act of 1990, a United States law
 Ouagadougou Peace Agreement, that put an end to the Ivorian Civil War
 Outward Processing Arrangement, a trade agreement between Hong Kong and mainland China

Organizations

Government agencies 
 Office of the Pardon Attorney, an agency of the United States Department of Justice
 Office of Population Affairs, a United States agency providing advice on population issues
 Office of Price Administration, a United States government office set up to stabilize prices and coordinate rationing after the outbreak of World War II
 Oil and Pipelines Agency, a United Kingdom agency
 Ontario Power Authority, a government agency in Canada

Other organizations
 FC OPA, an association football club from Oulu, Finland
 Postnominal letters used by the Anglican Order of Preachers (Ordo Praedicatorum Anglicanus)
 Online Privacy Alliance, a coalition of Internet companies
 OPA co. ltd. (Oriental Park Avenue), a Japanese clothing retail chain and subsidiary of Daiei
 Ordre des Palmes Academiques, an Order of Chivalry of France for academics and cultural and educational figures
 Oregon Pioneer Association, a fraternal-lineage society first established as the Oregon Pioneer Society in 1867
 Oregon Potters Association, a not-for-profit group of clay artists

People
 Opa Muchinguri, a Zimbabwean politician
 Opa Nguette, a French footballer
 Opa, nickname of Dorus Rijkers, Dutch lifeboat captain who rescued over 500 people in his career

Science and technology

Chemistry
 OPA mixture, a mixture used in chemical weapons
 Ortho-phthalaldehyde, a dialdehyde used in the synthesis of heterocyclic compounds and a reagent in the analysis of amino acids

Physics
 Open Public Alert, a public alert of a gravitational wave event
 Optical parametric amplifier, a laser light source that emits light of variable wavelengths

Computing
 Opa (programming language), a web development platform
 Intel Omni-Path architecture, a design for high performance computing
 Open Platform Architecture, a software interface from Ericsson Mobile Platforms for use internally in cellular phones
 Open Policy Agent, an open source policy engine cloud infrastructure from the Cloud Native Computing Foundation
 Oracle Policy Automation, an enterprise applications suite

Medicine 
 Oligo Pool Assay, a SNP genotyping platform from Illumina
 Oropharyngeal airway, a device used to keep the upper respiratory airway open
 Out-patient appointments
 Ovine pulmonary adenocarcinoma, a disease of the lungs in sheep and goats, also known as Jaagsiekte

Other uses
 Ambae Island, Vanuatu (also known as Opa)
 Opa! (Greek expression), a Greek interjection used in surprise or celebration
 Opa (roller coaster), a closed roller coaster in Wisconsin
 Toyota Opa, a car
 Opa Station, a North Korean railway station
 OPA grade tea

See also
Hopa (disambiguation)